Martje Saljé is a German Türmerin (loosely "Tower keeper"). She was appointed to the post at St Lambert's Church, Münster in January 2014, becoming the first woman since 1383 to have held the position.  (Earlier relevant records do not survive.)   "Türmer" and "Türmerin" are not officially designated job titles in Germany and it has indeed been known for tour guides to adopt the title for themselves. However, Martje Saljé is believed to be one of at least three genuine Türmer or Türmerinen in Germany who are also women. The nature of the duties has changed in recent decades: Martje Saljé's appointment to the St Lambert's post was nevertheless intended to preserve an authentic tradition.   (Guided tours are not possible here.)

Traditionally the job involved regular ascents to the top of a high tower in order to look out and warn fellow citizens (by means of a warning horn, bell, flags and/or, after dark, flashing lights) of approaching armies in time of war, and of outbreaks of house fires at any time. At times of intensified fire risk - for instance on windy days in periods of sustained hot dry weather, or in the event of possible firebomb attacks - it became necessary for a permanent watch to be kept from the top of the tower. In many middle European towns, medieval street patterns with their narrow streets endured well into or beyond the twentieth century, and where there is no readily accessible supply of building stone, the principal building material incorporated into most surviving residential and municipal buildings is timber.  Many homes were heated with peat which could often nurture simmering internal hotspots for hours after the fire was believed to have finished burning, and then burst into flames after the householders had gone to bed. This translated into intensified levels of fire risk in many towns and cities.   Münster's present Türmerin told an interviewer in 2015 that from her "office" at the top of the tall church tower she is still sometimes able to spot house fires and report them to the fire department, although "it does not happen so often" (es "kommt aber nicht allzu oft vor").

Biography

Personal
Martje Saljé was born in Bremen.   She spent a large part of her childhood living in Norway.   While she was growing up the family also lived for a time in Canada.     Gunther Salje, her father worked as professor of film and theatre.   She tells interviewers that even as a small child she had an appetite for performing, mastering a range of instruments including piano, guitar,  Double bass, flute, renaissance lute, accordion and 'cello.   While she was growing up, membership of the local church community provided ample opportunity for helping to shape the music in the church, performing in bands and, beyond the musical scene, for engaging in youth work more broadly.    After leaving school she studied History and Music at the University of Oldenburg.    She retains a powerful addiction to music, consciously fixing her own settings and improvisations on the "rules" identified and codified by Bach: "Music used to be how I supported myself: today it is my hobby".   She has performed on international tours in France, Belgium, Italy, Britain and Poland: she has worked with rock groups, dance troupes and jazz ensembles.

After leaving university she  worked in museums and archive departments and in teaching. She also continued to support herself as an itinerant musician.  Her application to take over the post of Türmerin (loosely "Tower keeper") was one of forty-six. Her fellow applicants included six other women. This is despite the fact that the post is a public-sector part-time position without the statutory notice period applicable to full-time positions, and involves extensive night-time and weekend working. Saljé therefore combines the post with a second, more conventional part-time position as a worker with the local Sparda-Bank: "something completely different, involving computers" ("Etwas ganz anderes, was mit Computern").

Notwithstanding her robustly ebullient manner, Martje Saljé is deeply religious. Religion drives much of her commitment to her work as "Türmerin". Despite being a Protestant, she has no issues with the fact that she undertakes her responsibilities in the tower of a Catholic church, and she makes no secret of feeling "a bit closer to Heaven" ("...dem Himmel ein Stück näher...") in her little office high above the city streets.   There is also more than a hint of vocation in her reaction when asked how long she intends to continue with her work as Türmerin: "My predecessor carried on till his seventieth year.  I might carry on for even longer if my joints hold out".

Professional "Türmerin" duties
Saljé's daily duties begin each day (except on Tuesdays, which are silent) at 20.30, with a walk up the 300 steps to her little office 75 meters up in the church tower. The climb takes her past the base of the flag pole that emerges at the top of the tower, past the three suspended cages that were used to display the tortured corpses of anabaptist rebels after the suppression 1535 rebellion, and past the so-called "council and fire bells" ("Rats- und Brandglocke") which normally, these days, are sounded only for mayoral elections.   The office is nevertheless positioned 25 meters below the tip of the spire that tops off the church tower.   It is a narrow room, about the size of a typical student room. It contains a desk and a desk-chair along with a separate chair and a bookcase. On one of the walls are photographs of other towers, some of which Martje Saljé has visited. There is also a photograph of Tinkabell and of Cocomau Miez de la Katz. These are the two cats with whom she shares her home '"...although really I'm a dog person").

Her first task each evening, still a little breathless from climbing up the tower, is to telephone the fire station to confirm that she is stationed for her shift in the tower.   Every half hour between 21.00 and midnight she sounds the "tower horn" three times, facing in succession south, west and north. She does not sound the horn towards the east, because in that direction there used to be a large cemetery and, by tradition, it is not part of her responsibility to disturb the souls of the dead.  An alternative explanation involves a rich and powerful man who used to live to the east of the tower and did not wish to be disturbed.   In former times the horn was sounded regularly through the night between 22.00 and 06.00.    The present instrument is made of copper and dates from 1950: it is based on a sixteenth century design. The tone resembles the blast from a ships horn, sounding a low C.

Those regular steady horn blasts traditionally reassure the citizens of Münster that they are facing neither an imminent fire in the city nor the approach of enemies from beyond the (imaginary) city walls.  The number of the blasts represents the time. At 21.00 there are nine blasts, with a brief pause after each batch of three. At 22.00 there are ten blasts, with a brief pause after the first two batches of three, followed by a third batch of four blasts. ("One has to breathe whilst blowing the horn! 2 Tootings are easy, 3 ooookay, 4 dang! any longer and the Tuermerin might feel somewhat giddy".)   The same pattern is followed till Midnight (twelve blasts in four batches of three) after which, in modern times, the citizens can spend the rest of the night undisturbed  by Martje Saljé's "tower horn".   Interviewed in May 2015, after just fifteen months in the job, Martje Saljé was able to report that she had already spotted several fire outbreaks while on watch. Under these circumstances her first duty is to telephone the  fire station to alert them to as many details as she can determine from her vantage point. After that she takes up her "tower horn". Instead of the steady long blasts she uses to communicate the time, she communicates the emergency with an urgent succession of staccato notes.

There is nevertheless very much more to Martje Saljé's approach to her job as "Türmerin" than enjoying the view out of her office window and blowing her horn at half hourly intervals during the latter part of the evening. She sees herself as a principal point of contact between the city of Münster and people all over the world: "Through my own blog [from my office in the tower] to the outside world I publicise the city's traditions ... I enter into real-time dialogue with other people and win for   Münster and for St Lambert's the interest of a completely new target group".  But she stresses that her employment is not with the church, but with the city.  She also operates a Facebook page from the tower.   In terms of gaining the attention of target groups, she is not unaware of the extra attention she gains by being both the first woman and the first inveterate blogger in more than six centuries to have served as Türmerin.

She also sees herself as an advocate and representative for the tower, taking part in media interviews and presentations, and performing in charity events on behalf of the church or the city.   She has opinions on many topics and is happy to share most of them.  Discussions recently arose as to whether it was entirely seemly that the church tower should be used to exhibit to passers-by the three cages that were used to display the tortured corpses of anabaptist rebels in the sixteenth century.  The history graduate had views to express: "They are part of the city's history, and it would be disingenuous to remove them.  You cannot explain everything through the prism of twenty-first century norms. They must stay there to generate discussions and support opinions. Münster can handle that!".   She also turns her hand to researching aspects of city history and joining in with website maintenance and development.   Even for Saljé, however, there are topics on which she keeps her own counsel.  In 2015 she rejected an interviewer's attempt to extract from her an opinion on the current (in 2019) chancellor: "As Türmerin of the city of Münster, thanks to the neutrality requirement I am not permitted to talk about politics. But I pay very close attention to what goes on in the world, in Europe and in Germany".

Notes

References

People from Bremen
People from Münster
Emergency population warning systems
Fire prevention
1980 births
Living people